Button, Button may refer to:

 Button, button, who's got the button?, a traditional children's game
 "Button, Button" (Asimov short story), a 1953 short story by Isaac Asimov
 "Button, Button" (Matheson short story), a short story by Richard Matheson
 "Button, Button" (The Twilight Zone), a 1986 episode of The Twilight Zone, based on the Matheson story